The Ingersoll School, a one-room schoolhouse near Washburn, North Dakota, was built in 1885.  It was listed on the National Register of Historic Places in 19.

Its 125th anniversary was celebrated in July, 2010.

References

School buildings on the National Register of Historic Places in North Dakota
School buildings completed in 1885
National Register of Historic Places in McLean County, North Dakota
Education in McLean County, North Dakota
1885 establishments in Dakota Territory
One-room schoolhouses in North Dakota